Bardon may refer to:

Places

Australia 

 Bardon, Queensland, suburb of Brisbane

England 
Bardon Mill, village in Northumberland
 In Leicestershire:
Bardon, Leicestershire, civil parish
Bardon Hill, highest point in Leicestershire

People
Cédric Bardon, French footballer
Franz Bardon, Czech occultist
Geoffrey Bardon, Australian populariser of Western Desert aboriginal "dot art"
John Bardon, actor who plays Jim Branning in EastEnders

Fictional characters 
Bardon (fictional character), in Donita K. Paul's Dragonkeeper Chronicles